Lake Louise is a lake in Luzerne County, Pennsylvania, in the United States. The lake is dammed by the Lake Louise Dam, which is in poor condition, as of 1980. As of 1980, its watershed is mostly forested. The Lake Louise Lake Association was given a Growing Greener mini-grant in 2012.

Geography, geology, and watershed
The main inflows to Lake Louise are Sutton Creek and two unnamed streams. The main outflow is Sutton Creek.

Lake Louise is dammed by the Lake Louise Dam. As of 1980, this dam is in poor condition, with a spillway capable of handling 45 percent of a probably maximum flood. It was classified as an "unsafe non-emergency dam".

Lake Louise is in the Glaciated Low Plateaus section of the Appalachian Plateaus physiographic province. The main rock formation underlying the lake is the Devonian-age Susquehanna Group, which consists of conglomerate, siltstone, sandstone, and shale.

As of 1980, the watershed of Lake Louise is mostly forested. Most slopes in the watershed are gentle or moderate.

Lake Louise is entirely within the United States Geological Survey quadrangle of Center Moreland.

Hydrology

For comparison, a phosphorus concentration of more than  indicates a eutrophic lake.

History
Lake Louise was entered into the Geographic Names Information System on August 2, 1979. Its identifier in the Geographic Names Information System is 1199089.

In 2012, the Lake Louise Lake Association was awarded a Growing Greener mini-grant for sediment removal, shoreline stabilization, riparian buffer establishment, and invasive species control on Lake Louise.

See also
List of lakes in Pennsylvania
Cummings Pond, also in the Sutton Creek watershed

References

External links
Image of Lake Louise

Lakes of Luzerne County, Pennsylvania
Lakes of Pennsylvania